Toucy is a commune in the Yonne department in Bourgogne-Franche-Comté in north-central France, in the historical region of Puisaye.

Personalities
Toucy was the birthplace and hometown of Pierre Larousse, lexicographer and founder of the publishing house that would later produce one of the most highly popular French dictionaries, Le Petit Larousse.
Léon Noël, French diplomat, politician and historian, died there in his domain in 1987.

Geography
The town lies in the middle of the commune, on the right bank of the Ouanne River, which flows northwest through the commune.

See also
Communes of the Yonne department

References

Communes of Yonne
Orléanais